Jim Gould was an intelligence officer who also served as a deputy at the Canadian Department of Foreign Affairs and International Trade.

In February 2003, Gould and an official from the Canadian Security Intelligence Service were allowed to interrogate American-held Canadian teenager Omar Khadr themselves. The presence of Gould, who brought Khadr a Big Mac value meal, allowed the government to claim that the purpose of the visit was "to ascertain Khadr's well-being", while his attorney Nate Whitling argued that "Foreign Affairs is suggesting that the visit was actually for [Khadr's] benefit, but this is not the case". His attorneys then sought a Federal Court injunction to prevent CSIS from interrogating their client in the future. The following month, a briefing from the Foreign Affairs department summarised Gould's findings stating that Khadr was a "thoroughly 'screwed up' young man. All those persons who have been in positions of authority over him have abused him and his trust, for their own purposes."

The November 14, 2003 report from the Canadian interrogation states that:

Assistant Director of CSIS William Hooper assured the Canadian public this interrogation was not intended to secure intelligence for an American prosecution but admitted that the information was all freely shared with his American captors - without securing any guarantees, such as foregoing potential death penalty charges.

Jim Gould died in 2016. A memorial article published late that year in bout de papier (Canada's Magazine of Diplomacy and Foreign Service) included the following:

References

Year of birth missing (living people)
Living people